The St Lawrence Academy (formerly High Ridge School) is a coeducational Church of England secondary school with academy status, in Scunthorpe, North Lincolnshire, England. The Academy teaches GCSEs and BTECs, and has specialisms in sports and science.

History

Grammar school
Scunthorpe Grammar School opened in 1927. It became a comprehensive, as High Ridge School, in 1968 when the Scunthorpe division of Lindsey turned comprehensive.

Comprehensive
A community school administered by North Lincolnshire Council, High Ridge School converted to academy status on 1 September 2008 and was renamed The St Lawrence Academy. The school is sponsored by the Church of England Diocese of Lincoln.

In 2011 demolition of the old building began and construction started as part of the Building Schools for the Future programme. The new building was built by May Gurney and was completed in October 2013. The old hall is refurbished but still remains.

Notable alumni

Scunthorpe Grammar School

 Roy Axe, car designer with Chrysler Europe in the 1970s, designing the Talbot Horizon and Alpine, later working for Austin Rover Group in the late 1980s
 Prof Gordon Dougan FRS, Head of Pathogen Research at the Wellcome Trust Sanger Institute in Cambridgeshire
 Ric Parker CBE FREng, Director of Research and Technology from 2001–16 at Rolls-Royce (at High Ridge from 1968)
 John Peck (politician), can be seen in the film Saturday Night and Sunday Morning, who belonged to the Communist Party of Great Britain (CPGB)
 David Plowright, CBE, television producer, younger brother of Joan, Controller of Programmes from 1969–79 at Granada Television (which helped his brother-in-law)
 Dame Joan Plowright, actress, married to Laurence Olivier from 1961 to his death in July 1989
 Major-General Dennis Shaw CB CBE, Head from 1975-78 of the Commando Logistic Regiment
 Graham Taylor OBE, former manager from 1990-93 of England
 Michael Tomlinson (engineer) FICE FIStructE, Chairman from 1969-71 of the British Geotechnical Association, who researched soil mechanics, groundwater control and design of piles who lived at Burton upon Stather
 Prof Stephen Westaby FRCS, Senior Cardiac Surgeon since 1986 at the John Radcliffe Hospital, and Professor of Biomedical Sciences since 2006 at the University of Wales

References

External links
The St Lawrence Academy official website

Secondary schools in the Borough of North Lincolnshire
Church of England secondary schools in the Diocese of Lincoln
Academies in the Borough of North Lincolnshire
Schools in Scunthorpe